Shaw Mills is a hamlet in the civil parish of Bishop Thornton, Shaw Mills and Warsill, in Nidderdale in the Harrogate district, North Yorkshire, England.

The village probably takes its name from a corn mill kept by one Robert Shaw in the 16th century.  In 1812 John and George Metcalfe began spinning flax in the Low Mill at Shaw Mills  The High Mill and Low Mill both closed by 1861, but in about 1890 were restarted for silk-spinning. The mills closed soon after the First World War.  An industrial settlement developed in the 19th century to serve the mills. And it is now derelict and about to fall down

References

Sources 

Villages in North Yorkshire
Nidderdale